Abdullah Saleh Al-Dosari (born 1 November 1969) is a Saudi Arabian football defender who played for Saudi Arabia in the 1994 FIFA World Cup. He also played for Ettifaq FC.

References

Saudi Arabian footballers
Saudi Arabia international footballers
Association football defenders
Ettifaq FC players
1988 AFC Asian Cup players
Footballers at the 1990 Asian Games
1992 King Fahd Cup players
1992 AFC Asian Cup players
AFC Asian Cup-winning players
1994 FIFA World Cup players
1969 births
Living people
Asian Games competitors for Saudi Arabia
21st-century Saudi Arabian people
20th-century Saudi Arabian people